Guitar Loops is the first solo album by Spiritualized frontman Jason Pierce.
It was recorded in one continuous take at Amazing Grace Studio in London, a few days before he was taken ill with pneumonia.
Spaceman plays a Fender Jaguar through a Fender Superchamp and percussion.
It was originally released in a limited edition signed printing on John Coxon's Treader record label.

References

2006 debut albums
Jason Pierce albums